is a former Japanese Infielder with the Yomiuri Giants.

External links

1989 births
Baseball people from Kumamoto Prefecture
Japanese baseball coaches
Japanese baseball players
Living people
Nippon Professional Baseball coaches
Nippon Professional Baseball second basemen
Nippon Professional Baseball shortstops
Nippon Professional Baseball third basemen
Yomiuri Giants players